NGC 2194 is an open cluster in the constellation Orion. The cluster is located about 10,000 light years away from Earth. It is rich and moderately concentrated. The cluster lies 33 arcminutes west-northwest of 73 Orionis.

Observation history 
It was discovered by William Herschel on 11 February 1784, and it was added in his catalogue as IV 5. It was added to the General Catalogue as 1383. The cluster was also observed by Adolph Cornelius Petersen in 1849 with the 18 cm refractor at the Altona Observatory. The cluster was also observed by Hermann Carl Vogel, without mentioning its General Catalogue number. John Louis Emil Dreyer added it to GCS as number 5380, as Heinrich Louis d'Arrest's discovery from 18 September 1862, without noticing it was already included.

Characteristics 
NGC 2194 is a rich and moderately concentrated, with Trumpler class III1r, open cluster. The brightest stars of the cluster are of magnitude 10, the brightest being of magnitude 10.26. The cluster has 149 members down to 15th magnitude. The main sequence turn off is at magnitude 14.5 and there are few red giants members. There are some stars that are bluer than the turn-off point and if they are members of the cluster they are possibly blue stragglers. The photometric study of the cluster by Sanner and al. concluded that the age of the cluster is 550 Myr and its distance is 2,900 pc. Piatti et al. determined the age of the cluster to be 400 Myr and its distance to be 3,200 pc. The cluster has low metallicity (−0.27 ± 0.06). It is located 130 pc south of the galactic plane.

References

External links 

2194
Orion (constellation)
Open clusters